Mišar is a town in the municipality of Šabac, Serbia. According to the 2002 census, the town has a population of 2,217 people.

History 

In August 1806, the Battle of Mišar occurred in this village.

References

Populated places in Mačva District
Šabac